The R171 road is a regional road in Ireland linking Dundalk and Greengates in County Louth, via Blackrock.

See also 

 Roads in Ireland
 National primary road
 National secondary road

References 

Regional roads in the Republic of Ireland
Roads in County Louth